A Song About the Gray Pigeon is a 1961 Czechoslovak film directed by Stanislav Barabáš. It was entered into the 1961 Cannes Film Festival.

Cast
 Radoslav Bartoník
 Vladimir Brecka
 Karla Chadimová
 Ladislav Chudík
 Vladimír Durdík
 Jana Hlavácová
 Karol Machata
 Pavel Mattos
 Pavle Polacek
 Olga Zöllnerová

References

External links
 

1961 films
Czechoslovak war films
Slovak-language films
Slovak war drama films